Stanley Grant (1902–1993) was a British cinematographer and special effects expert. During the 1930s he worked mainly on quota quickies. In the 1940s he was employed on more prestigious films such as David Lean's Oliver Twist.

Selected filmography

Cinematographer
 Flame in the Heather (1935)
 Full Speed Ahead (1936)
 Find the Lady (1936)
 The Big Noise (1936)
 Highland Fling (1936)
 Blind Man's Bluff (1936)
 The Black Tulip (1937)
 Jennifer Hale (1937)
 East of Ludgate Hill (1937)
 There Was a Young Man (1937)
 False Evidence (1937)
Behind Your Back (1937)
 The Villiers Diamond (1938)
 Dial 999 (1938)
 The Last Barricade (1938)
 Ghost Ship (1952)

Special effects
 Uncle Silas (1947)
 Odd Man Out (1947)
 Oliver Twist (1948)

References

Bibliography
 Phillips, Gene. Beyond the Epic: The Life and Films of David Lean. University Press of Kentucky, 2006.

External links

1902 births
1993 deaths
British cinematographers
People from Leicester